Sanroku Station (山麓駅) is the name of two train stations in Japan:

 Sanroku Station (Fukuoka)
Sanroku Station (Tokyo)